Laid-Back Camp Original Soundtrack is the soundtrack album of C-Station's Laid-Back Camp (2018). It was published in Japan by 5pb. on March 21, 2018.

Background
Akiyuki Tateyama served as the composer for the first season of Laid-Back Camp. He composed the music characterizing the campsites based on photographs shown to him by director Yoshiaki Kyōgoku since the latter wanted the music to match a specific scenery rather than the characters. Tateyama cited acoustic guitar, banjo, and mandolin as one of the instruments he used in composing the soundtracks. For Rin Shima's theme, he used mandolin since he found its tone fitting with the character's personality and behavior.

Track listing
All music is composed by Tateyama, except where indicated. Excluded from the list are the audio dramas written by Jin Tanaka, with Yumiri Hanamori and Nao Tōyama reprising their respective voice roles as Nadeshiko Kagamihara and Shima.

Chart

References

External links
 Official website's music page 

Anime soundtracks
2018 soundtrack albums